Taxodium  is a genus of one to three species (depending on taxonomic opinion) of extremely flood-tolerant conifers in the cypress family, Cupressaceae. The generic name is derived from the Latin word taxus, meaning "yew", and the Greek word εἶδος (eidos), meaning "similar to." Within the family, Taxodium is most closely related to Chinese swamp cypress (Glyptostrobus pensilis) and sugi (Cryptomeria japonica).

Species of Taxodium occur in the southern part of the North American continent and are deciduous in the north and semi-evergreen to evergreen in the south. The cones are globose,  diameter, with 10-25 scales, each scale with 1-2 seeds; they are mature in 7–9 months after pollination, when they disintegrate to release the seeds. The male (pollen) cones are produced in pendulous racemes, and shed their pollen in early spring. Taxodium species grow cypress knees, when growing in or beside water. The function of these knees is currently a subject of ongoing research.

Species 
The three extant taxa of Taxodium are treated here as distinct species, though some botanists treat them in just one or two species, with the others considered as varieties of the first described. The three are distinct in ecology, growing in different environments, but hybridise where they meet.

†Taxodium dubium (Sternb.) Heer

Formerly placed here
 Glyptostrobus pensilis (Staunton ex D.Don) K.Koch (as T. japonicum var. heterophyllum Brongn.)
 Sequoia sempervirens (D.Don) Endl. (as T. sempervirens D.Don)

Uses 

The trees are especially prized for their wood, of which the heartwood is extremely rot- and termite-resistant.  The heartwood contains a sesquiterpene called cypressene, which acts as a natural preservative.  It takes decades for cypressene to accumulate in the wood, so lumber taken from old-growth trees is more rot resistant than that from second-growth trees. However, age also increases susceptibility to Pecky Rot fungus (Stereum taxodii), which attacks the heartwood and causes some damaged trees to become hollow and thus useless for timber. Bald Cypress wood was much used in former days in the southeastern United States for roof shingles. The shredded bark of these trees is used as a mulch.

Evolution 

In earth's history Taxodium was much more widespread in the Northern Hemisphere than today. The oldest fossils were found in Late Cretaceous deposits from North America. The trees persisted in Europe until around 2.5 million years ago, during the Pliocene.

See also
Bükkábrány mummified forest

References

External links

Gymnosperm Database - Taxodium
Corkscrew Swamp Sanctuary website
National Audubon Society, undated. Corkscrew Swamp Sanctuary. A Companion Field Guide. Artype Inc., Ft. Myers. 25 p.

 
Extant Late Cretaceous first appearances
Conifer genera
Deciduous conifers